Taghavard or Taghaverd is a village in the disputed region of Nagorno-Karabakh. The village had an ethnic Armenian-majority population in 1989.

Following the 2020 Nagorno-Karabakh war, the eastern, lower part of the village, Nerkin Taghavard (also called Taghavard Kaler), is controlled by the breakaway Republic of Artsakh as part of its Martuni Province, and the western, upper part of the village, Verin Taghavard, is controlled by Azerbaijan as part of its Khojavend District.

Toponymy 
The name Taghavard derives from two Armenian words, Tagh, meaning quarter (of a city), and Vard, meaning rose.

History 

During the Soviet period, the village was a part of the Martuni District of the Nagorno-Karabakh Autonomous Oblast.

Historical heritage sites 
Historical heritage sites in and around Taghavard include the 12th/13th-century monastery of Barevatsari Vank (also known as Jukht/Jokht Pravatsari Vank), the 17th-century Berdahonj Church, and the church of Surb Astvatsatsin built in 1840.

In July 2021, satellite images released by Caucasus Heritage Watch, a watchdog group made up of researchers from Purdue and Cornell, revealed that Azerbaijani bulldozers had cleared the western half of the village, thereby endangering the St. Astvatsatsin Church. It called on Azerbaijani authorities to prevent damage or destruction.

Economy and culture 
The population is mainly engaged in agriculture and animal husbandry. As of 2015, the village had a municipal building, a house of culture, two schools, a kindergarten, three shops, and a medical centre.

Demographics 
The village had 1,315 inhabitants in 2005, and 1,301 inhabitants in 2015.

References

External links 
 
 "Taghavard sb. Astvatsatsin ekeghetsi" [The Holy Mother of God church of Taghavard]. Monument Watch.
 

Populated places in Khojavend District
Populated places in Martuni Province